Thomas Clark Bundy (October 8, 1881 – October 13, 1945) was a tennis player from Los Angeles, California, who was active in the early 20th century. With Maurice McLoughlin, he won three doubles titles at the U.S. National Championships. Bundy Drive, a major thoroughfare in West Los Angeles, is named for him.

Tennis career
Bundy won the All-Comers singles final against Beals Wright, but finished runner-up to William Larned in a five-set Challenge Round at the U.S. National Championships in 1910. He also reached the semifinals in 1909 and 1911. Bundy won three consecutive doubles titles at the championships, alongside Maurice McLoughlin, in 1912, 1913, and 1914. 

When the Los Angeles Tennis Club was founded in 1920 Bundy was elected as its first president.

Personal life
On December 11, 1912 Bundy married tennis player U.S. National Championships and Wimbledon champion May Sutton. They separated in 1923 and were divorced in 1940. The couple had four children including daughter Dorothy Cheney, a tennis player who won the singles title at the 1938 Australian Championships.

Grand Slam finals

Singles (1 runner-up)

Doubles (3 titles, 2 runner-ups)

Grand Slam tournament singles performance timeline

References

External links

 
 

American male tennis players
Tennis players from Los Angeles
United States National champions (tennis)
1881 births
1945 deaths
Grand Slam (tennis) champions in men's doubles